The Indian Institute of Planning and Management (IIPM) is a now defunct unaccredited institute that was based in New Delhi.

IIPM may also refer to:

 Indian Institute of Personnel Management, an institute focused on human resources management
 International Institute of Political Murder, a theatre and film production company founded by Milo Rau

See also
 IPM (disambiguation)